Genesis Mamea Lemalu (born 22 September 1988 in Samoa) is a Samoan rugby union player who plays for  in the Top 14. His playing position is flanker. He made his debut for Samoa in 2016 against France.

Reference list

External links
itsrugby.co.uk profile

1988 births
Samoan rugby union players
Samoa international rugby union players
Living people
Rugby union flankers
Wellington rugby union players
Stade Montois players
USA Perpignan players